Carlo Weber (born 6 April 1934 in Saarbrücken, Germany, died 15 May 2014) was a German architect and professor, the founder and senior partner of Auer+Weber+Assoziierte.

Career
 1953–1961    studied and graduated at TH Stuttgart (Stuttgart University)
 1959–1960    Scholarship to the École nationale supérieure des Beaux-Arts, Paris
 1962          graduated from TH Stuttgart
 1960–1965    Behnisch and Lambart, Stuttgart
 1965          Yamasaki+Associates, Birmingham, Michigan, USA
 1966–1979    Partner in Behnisch & Partner, and designed Olympiapark with Günter Behnisch and Fritz Auer in Munich
 since 1980    Office Auer+Weber with Fritz Auer
 1985–1992    Lecturer of Stuttgart University
 1993–2001    Professor of Dresden University of Technology
 since 1996    Member of Sächsische Akademie der Künste

See also
Auer+Weber+Assoziierte
Fritz Auer

References

External links 
Auer+Weber+Assoziierte
 

20th-century German architects
Auer+Weber+Assoziierte
1934 births
2014 deaths
University of Stuttgart alumni